Ghost Tropic is a 2019 Belgian drama film directed by Bas Devos. It was screened in the Directors' Fortnight section at the 2019 Cannes Film Festival.

Plot
A woman falls asleep on the subway. Arriving at the end of the line, there are no more trains running and she decides to make the long walk home on foot. A journey through the city of Brussels that leads to a series of nocturnal encounters.

Cast
 Maaike Neuville
 Nora Dari
 Saadia Bentaïeb
 Stefan Gota
 Cédric Luvuezo

References

External links
 

2019 films
2019 drama films
Belgian drama films
2010s French-language films